Koramangala is situated in the south-eastern part of Bengaluru, it is one of the largest neighborhoods, and is a residential locality with wide, tree-lined boulevards and a mix of commercial structures, and bungalows. Planned as a suburb post-independence, its location between Bengaluru and Electronic City attracted migrants from across the country during Bengaluru's tech boom of the late 1990s. Consequently, it has gradually developed into a commercial hub. Koramangala is also Bengaluru's prominent startup hub.

Geography
Koramangala is divided into 8 blocks spread over approximately 1800 acres. Blocks 1–4 are separated from blocks 5–8 by the Inner Ring Road leading to Domlur/Indiranagar. Up to the 1970s, one would pass the village of Adugodi on the Hosur Road and then usually bypass Koramangala which was on the left while going to the industrial suburbs of Bommanahalli or Bommasandra, about 10 and 20 kilometres away respectively. Settlement was sparse in Koramangala, and only towards the late 1970s did more houses get constructed. The road to Bommanahalli and Bommasandra now houses Electronics City, home to many technology firms including the global software giant Infosys.

Location

References

External links

Neighbourhoods in Bangalore